Kony: Order from Above is a 2017 Ugandan war film directed by Steve T. Ayeny. It was initially reported as being the Ugandan entry for the Best International Feature Film at the 92nd Academy Awards. However, it was later confirmed as not being selected as it could not meet the mandatory minimum requirements. It would have been Uganda's first ever submission to the Oscars. It also received a nomination for Best Feature Film and Cinematography at the 2017 Uganda Film Festival Awards

Plot
Amidst the insurgency of the Lord's Resistance Army, two young lovers are separated.

Cast
 Joel Okuyo Prynce as Kony
 Steve T. Ayeny as Agutti
 Michael Wawuyo

See also
 List of submissions to the 92nd Academy Awards for Best International Feature Film

References

External links
 

2017 films
2010s war films
Ugandan war films
Swahili-language films
Films set in Uganda